Henry "Mike" Strater (1896–1987) was an American painter, and illustrator. He was a friend of Ernest Hemingway and other figures of the Lost Generation. He was known for his portraiture, figurative, and landscape drawings and paintings. Strater founded the Ogunquit Museum of American Art in Ogunquit, Maine in either 1952 or 1953.

Early life and education 
Henry Strater was born on January 21, 1896, in Louisville, Kentucky. He attended Princeton University. While attending Princeton he befriend F. Scott Fitzgerald. Strater was Fitzgerald's inspiration for the character "Burne Halliday" from the novel This Side of Paradise (1920).

During 1917 and World War I, Strater enlisted in the French Red Cross and drove ambulances. In 1919 he returned to the United States to studied at the Art Students League of New York and Pennsylvania Academy of the Fine Arts. He also took some classes at Real Academia de Bellas Artes de San Fernando in Madrid.

In the 1920s, Strater studied at the Académie de la Grande Chaumière in the Montparnasse district of Paris, under Edouard Vuillard. While in Paris, Strater met Hemingway in a bar, where they had a brawl. Later they became friends and Strater painted two portraits of Hemingway in late 1922 while still in Paris.

Career 

Ezra Pound had Strater illustrate part of the book, The Cantos. 

His friendship with Hemingway ended in 1935, over a Time magazine photo of Marlin fishing that incorrectly credited Hemingway with catching Strater's oversized fish. Hemingway did not correct the issue.

In either 1952 or 1953, Strater founded the Ogunquit Museum of American Art in Ogunquit, Maine.

Death and legacy 
He died at the age of 91 on December 21, 1987, in Palm Beach. He is buried at the First Parish Cemetery in York, Maine. 

Strater's work can be found in museums including the Chrysler Museum of Art, Harvard Art Museums, Art Institute of Chicago, Detroit Institute of Arts, and Princeton University Art Museum.

References

External links 
 , has photos

1896 births
1987 deaths
American male painters
Artists from Louisville, Kentucky
Princeton University alumni
Art Students League of New York alumni
Pennsylvania Academy of the Fine Arts alumni
People from Palm Beach, Florida
American illustrators